Karomama (A), also known as Karamat, was an ancient Egyptian queen consort. She is only known from the stela of Pasenhor through which is known that she was the wife of pharaoh Shoshenq I and mother of pharaoh Osorkon I.

References

Queens consort of the Twenty-second Dynasty of Egypt
10th-century BC Egyptian women
10th-century BC Egyptian people